Modestus of Jerusalem (died December 16, 630) was a Patriarch of Jerusalem, who is commemorated as a saint by the Catholic Church on December 17th, and by the Eastern Orthodox Church, on May 17, March 29 or December 16
. The Palestinian-Georgian calendar venerates him on December 16 and October 19 in the Acta Sanctorum.

Life 

He was born in Cappadocian Sebasteia. Five months old at his Christian parents' death, he was raised as a Christian. As an adult he was sold as a slave in Egypt, but converted his pagan master to Christianity and was freed by him. Withdrawing to Mount Sinai to live as an ascetic, he was later made abbot of the Monastery of St. Theodosius in Palestine.

In 614 Chosroes II destroyed Jerusalem, killed 66,509 Christians and captured the Patriarch of Jerusalem (then Zacharias), other Christians and the True Cross. Modestus had been on his way to raise Greek troops to oppose this and was surrounded by Persian troops, having a narrow escape. Modestus was then chosen to stand in for Zacharias as Patriarch. He buried the monks killed at the monastery of Saint Sabbas the Sanctified and rebuilt the Holy Sepulchre, the city's churches and monasteries with help from John the Merciful, Patriarch of Alexandria. He became patriarch in his own right after Zacharias died in Persia when Heraclius visited the city to restore the True Cross in March 630. On Modestus's death he was buried in the Church of the Eleona on the Mount of Olives.

References

External links
Building projects of Modestus
Orthodox Church in America - Modestus of Jerusalem

7th-century patriarchs of Jerusalem
Eastern Orthodox saints
7th-century Christian saints
Christian slaves and freedmen
630 deaths
Saints from the Holy Land